The Challenge Argentina: El Desafío is an Argentine spin-off of the American reality competition series The Challenge, featuring Argentinian reality television contestants and celebrities competing against one another in various challenges to avoid elimination.

The series, hosted by TV presenter Marley, premiered on Telefe on February 13, 2023.

Background 
In February 2022, a new series of international seasons of The Challenge was announced to air later in the year. The series comprises four new editions of The Challenge, which includes The Challenge: USA, The Challenge: Australia, The Challenge Argentina: El Desafío and The Challenge UK. These local renditions are expected to be followed by a fifth series in which winners and select contestants of each series will compete again on another season titled The Challenge: World Championship, which is expected to air on Paramount+.

In addition to the opportunity to represent the Argentine series in The Challenge: World Championship, cast members also competed to win an ARG$15,000,000 prize pool. Unlike other spin-off versions, there was only one winner.

Contestants

Format
Argentina: El Desafío consists of a daily challenge, winner's selection and an elimination round. For the first ten episodes, players compete in male-female pairs which change for each cycle of the game.
Daily Challenge: Players compete in the main challenge in male/female teams of two. The last-place team is automatically sent to the elimination round. The winners earn the power to select a second team to compete in the elimination against the last-place team.
Eliminations ("The Arena"): The last-place team from the daily challenge compete in an elimination round against the team selected by the winners of the daily challenge. The winners remain in the game while the losers are eliminated.
In episode 11, the game changed to an individual format. Players compete in daily challenges individually, where the last-place players of the each gender are automatically sent to Arena to compete individually against a same-gender opponent (who had recently been eliminated) later selected by the winners.
 Twists
The Algorithm: From episodes 1-10, an algorithm assigns players a new partner of the opposite gender for each cycle of the game. Players must be assigned a new partner they haven't previously been paired with, and cannot have the same partner twice in a row if they have already partnered with each eligible remaining player. The Algorithm also selected pairs during the Final Challenge.
Re-entry Twist: The winners of the "Te Cayó la Ficha" challenge had to select one eliminated player of each gender (from the six most-recently eliminated contestants) to return and compete in the Arena against the last-place players of the challenge. The winners continue in the game while the losers are eliminated.

Gameplay

Challenge games
El Patrón Letal: Teams race 800 metres down a path to a pattern covered by blinds. There, one team member must balance one-footed on a narrow pole to open the blinds and reveal the pattern for their partner to memorise. After the team member balancing falls off, teams must return to their board at the start and attempt to replicate their pattern, repeating this process until they correctly recreate the entire pattern. The first team to finish wins while the last team to finish is automatically sent to the Arena.
Winners: Juli & Oky
Remo y Corona: Played in two heats. Team members alternate turns paddling a surfboard to collect four crown pieces floating in a lake, then use them to assemble a crown. The team with the fastest time wins while the team with the slowest time is automatically sent to the Arena.
Winners: Juli & Rodri
Respuesta Boleadora: Teams must solve three numerical questions, search a mud pit for six balls to form the answers and clip them onto strings to form three bolas. Teams must then throw their bolas into their post from behind a line. The first team to land all three bolas wins while the last team to finish is automatically sent to the Arena.
Winners: Rodri & Virgie
Habemus Barril: Teams must transfer four 50-kilogram barrels across a field, stacking them to reach and set off flares atop three stations along the way. The team that sets off all three flares and transfers all four barrels to the finish line first wins while the last team to finish is automatically sent to the Arena.
Winners: Eva & Rodri
La Guerra Fría: One team member must feel through a covered box at one end of a course for three cubes with shapes on each face. They must then meet their partner describe the pattern to them so they can assemble the cubes using puzzle pieces at the other end of the course. However, teams must immerse themselves in an ice bath at the middle of the course while communicating the descriptions. The first team to correctly assemble their cubes wins while the last team is automatically sent to the Arena.
Winners: Oky & Sol
Te Cayó la Ficha: Each player begins with a six-by-five board. Throughout the challenge, they must search the Estadio Tomás Adolfo Ducó for their colored tokens, and can either place the tokens on their board to try and line up four tokens in a row or flip the tokens over and place them on an opponent’s board to block them. The first male and female player to line up four tokens on their board wins while the last male and female player to do so are automatically sent to the Arena.
Winners: Eva & Rodri

Arena games
Enredo Piramidal: Teams have 15 minutes to create as many knots as they can using a 35-metre rope within a pyramid structure. After those 15 minutes are up, teams switch positions and must untie their opponent's knots. The first team to untie their opponent's knots and drag the rope across a marked line wins.
Played by: Adro & Eva vs. Burlando & Carolina
Hacete la Rata: Teams begin inside a giant steel wheel connected to a 120-metre rope with a ball at the end. They must spin the wheel to unravel the rope and pull the ball towards them. The first team to pull the ball towards their wheel twice wins.
Played by: Adro & Fernanda vs. Floppy & Lizardo
Me Muevo Te Muevas: Teams must stand on and tilt two platforms to maneuver five balls through a table maze. The first team to move all five balls to the end of the maze wins.
Played by: Claudia & Oky vs. Jujuy & Morita
En Tu Cara: Teams must stack cinder blocks on a box to release a set of balls. One team member must then throw the balls at ten targets of their opponent's faces while their partner tries to block their opponent's shots. The first team to hit all ten targets wins.
Played by: Benja & Fernanda vs. Juli & Lio Ferro
Rotas Cadenas: Teams open six panels at the top of a tall wall to reveal six trivia questions. They must search among several medicine balls wrapped in chains for six with the answers on them, and hang them on hooks below their respective question. The first team to correctly answer all six questions wins.
Played by: Adro & Virgie vs. Claudia & Rodri
Tire y Empuje: Each round, players begin tethered to their opponent at the center of the Arena. They must knock over their three stacks of blocks at the boundary of the Arena while their opponent tries to do the same. The first player to knock over all three stacks wins the round. The first player to win two rounds wins the elimination.
Played by: Adro vs. Oky, Claudia vs. Fernanda

Final Challenge
The remaining eight players competed in the Final Challenge. The first part of the Final Challenge consisted of four timed stages (or etapas) which players complete in male-female pairs; the Algorithm decided new pairs for each stage. At the end of Stage 4, the two individuals with the slowest overall times were eliminated.

Stage 1: Teams must collectively cycle 30 km on stationary bikes before proceeding to the end of the stage. 
Stage 2: Teams must cycle bicycles to a river. There, each team member must swim to different sides of the river to collect bags of puzzle pieces from a platform. After returning the puzzle pieces to their station, teams must then run down a path to view and memorize an answer key before recreating the key at their station using the puzzle pieces and proceeding to the end of the stage.
Stage 3: Teams must use a plank and three barrels to cross a field without touching the ground before proceeding to the end of the stage.
Stage 4: Teams must push a car across a field before proceeding to the end of the stage where each individual's time from the four stages are calculated. The two players with the slowest overall times are eliminated from the Final Challenge.
Eliminated: Juli (8th place - 3 hours, 3 minutes, 18 seconds)
Eliminated: Lio Ferro (7th place - 2 hours 58 minutes, 33 seconds)

In the second part of the Final Challenge, the remaining six contestants compete three continuous stages individually. At the end of the third stage, each contestant's overall time from the entire Final Challenge is totalled to determine the winner of Argentina: El Desafío, who also receives ARG$15,000,000.

Stage 5: Players must pull a sled across a field then arrange four cubes so that each side shows four unique symbols before proceeding to the next stage.
Stage 6: Players must throw golf balls from behind a marked line to hit a hanging target before cycling to the next checkpoint.
Stage 7: Players must transfer seven tyres labelled with the names of Argentinian cities down a track and arrange them on a pole by latitude before proceeding to the finish line. After each player finishes, the results are announced.

Final results
Winner: Sol (3 hours, 2 minutes, 0 seconds)
Runner-up: Oky (3 hours, 23 minutes, 0 seconds)
Third place: Yeyo (3 hours, 34 minutes, 7 seconds)
Fourth place: Rodri (3 hours, 38 minutes, 58 seconds)
Fifth place: Eva (4 hours, 13 minutes, 26 seconds)
Sixth place: Claudia (4 hours, 14 minutes, 20 seconds)

Game summary

Episode progress

Competition key
 The contestant won the Final Challenge
 The contestant lost the Final Challenge 
 The contestant was eliminated during the Final Challenge 
 The contestant won the daily challenge
 The contestant was not selected for the Arena
 The contestant won the elimination in the Arena
 The contestant lost in the Arena and was eliminated

Team progress
From episodes 1-10, and the Final Challenge, the Algorithm randomly determined pairs for each cycle of the game.

Reception

Viewing figures

Special episode
The season also featured a special episode which was uploaded to Paramount+ but did not air on Telefe. The special involved host Marley interviewing the eight finalists and having their family members visit them ahead of the Final Challenge.

Notes

References

Argentina: El Desafío, The Challenge
Argentine reality television series
Television shows filmed in Argentina
Television shows set in Argentina
Reality television spin-offs
Telefe original programming